Chris Terry may refer to:

 Chris Terry (American football) (born 1975), American football offensive tackle
 Chris Terry (ice hockey) (born 1989), Canadian professional ice hockey player